The Pleasant Valley School building is an example of a one-room country school that was common throughout Oklahoma during the late 1800s and early 1900s. The building was built in 1899 and continued to function as a one-room school until 1941. It remains the only extant one-room, frame school building in Payne County.  It is one of the very few in Oklahoma still located on its original site and still playing the role of an educational and social center.

References

School buildings on the National Register of Historic Places in Oklahoma
Buildings and structures in Stillwater, Oklahoma
School buildings completed in 1899
School museums
Museums in Payne County, Oklahoma
Museums established in 1988
1988 establishments in Oklahoma
1899 establishments in Oklahoma Territory
One-room schoolhouses in Oklahoma
National Register of Historic Places in Payne County, Oklahoma
Tourist attractions in Stillwater, Oklahoma